The Peter J. Bontadelli House, at 119 Cayuga St. in Salinas, California, is a historic  house that was built in 1907.  Listed on the National Register of Historic Places in 1979, it was then the unique example of Second Empire architecture in all of Monterey County, California.  It was built by Peter J. Bontadelli (1850-1935), an immigrant from Switzerland who had experience in Paris as a painting contractor.  Bontadelli became a leader of the Swiss-American community in the area, including co-founding and serving as first president of the Swiss-American Rifle Club which opened in 1900 and is still operating in 2013 (now as the Monterey County Swiss Rifle Club).  The house is of very high architectural quality.

References

Houses on the National Register of Historic Places in California
Houses on the National Register of Historic Places in Monterey County, California
Second Empire architecture in California
Houses completed in 1907
Houses in Monterey County, California
Buildings and structures in Salinas, California
National Register of Historic Places in Monterey County, California
Swiss-American history